The London, Brighton and South Coast Railway C3 class was a class of 0-6-0 steam locomotives, intended for heavy freight trains.  Ten were built by Brighton railway works in 1906 to the design of Douglas Earle Marsh.

History

This class was intended to replace the smaller Robert Billinton C2 class 0-6-0 on the heaviest freight services. However, although they had an effective boiler, their performance proved to be disappointing and the fuel consumption high. Rather than building any further examples Marsh preferred to rebuild the existing locomotives into the C2X class. The members of the C3 class therefore spent their days on secondary freight trains in mid Sussex. Seven of the class spent most of their lives at Horsham and as a result the class was nicknamed "Horsham Goods".

The boiler designed by Marsh for the C3 class was later used with considerably more success on the SR Z class 0-8-0 of 1929.

Grouping and Nationalisation

All of the class passed to the Southern Railway in 1923, but the trade recession of the 1930s caused a decline in freight traffic resulting in the withdrawal of two locomotives in 1936/7. However, the advent of the Second World War ensured that the remaining examples all survived until after the nationalisation of the railways to British Railways in 1948. The remaining locomotives in the class were all withdrawn between 1948 and 1952. No examples have been preserved.

Locomotive Summary

References

Sources

 Bradley, D.L. (1974) Locomotives of the London Brighton and South Coast Railway, Part 3. Railway Correspondence and Travel Society.

External links
  SREmG image gallery
  Rail UK database C3

C2
0-6-0 locomotives
Railway locomotives introduced in 1906
Scrapped locomotives
Freight locomotives